Men of the Year were a villainous professional wrestling tag team composed of Ethan Page and Scorpio Sky. The team were  currently performing in All Elite Wrestling (AEW).

History

All Elite Wrestling (2021–present) 
On the March 29 episode of Dark: Elevation, Page and Sky formed an alliance when Page attacked Matt Sydal following Sky's victory over him. Shortly afterwards, they began feuding with Darby Allin and Sting, but were defeated in a tag team match at Double or Nothing. On the June 18 episode of Dynamite (taped June 6), Page and Sky, now going by the Men of the Year, defeated Allin in a two on one handicap match. On the July 14 episode of Dynamite, Page was defeated by Allin in a coffin match, ending the feud.

The Men of the Year would later align themselves with Dan Lambert of American Top Team, and from then on, accompanied Lambert while he cut his promos. This continued until the September 15 episode of Dynamite, where The Inner Circle's Chris Jericho interrupted Lambert and a match between the Men of the Year and Jericho and Jake Hager was set for the September 24 episode of Rampage, in which they were victorious.

On the October 6 episode of Dynamite, it was announced that dos Santos would be making his professional wrestling debut in a trios match the following week. On the October 15 episode of Rampage, dos Santos and Men of the Year defeated Jericho, Hager and Sammy Guevara, after interference from VanZant and Masvidal. On the October 16 episode of Dynamite, the Inner Circle returned as a quintet for the first time in months, with Santana and Ortiz coming back. Jericho wanted a five-on-five tag team match, but Lambert told him that Men of the Year were moving on, and they have bigger plans which include championships. On the October 23 episode of Dynamite, Lambert told Guevara that ATT and Men of the Year will have the ten-man tag match, but only if he defends the AEW TNT Championship against Page. Lambert also added that if Guevara loses, he leaves the Inner Circle for good. Guevara accepted, but stated that if he wins, the Inner Circle choose who will represent ATT at Full Gear. Over the next two weeks, Guevara defeated Page, and Inner Circle chose dos Santos, Arlovski and Lambert as ATT's representatives in a Minnesota street fight. On the November 10 episode of Dynamite, the Inner Circle were jumped by Men of the Year and ATT on the entrance ramp, resulting in a beatdown. Lambert and Men of the Year cornered Jericho and took him to the ring, before Lambert performed an assisted powerbomb through a table on Jericho. Lambert then mockingly put Jericho in his own hold, the Walls of Jericho, although he was keen to stress that it is called a Boston crab, referencing Rocky Johnson. On November 13, at Full Gear, the Inner Circle defeated ATT and Men of the Year, with Jericho hitting a frogsplash on Lambert for the pin.

On the December 8 episode of Dynamite, Page announced that Lambert would be returning to AEW. Following a confrontation with Cody Rhodes, On the March 9 episode of Dynamite, Sky defeated Sammy Guevara for the AEW TNT Championship. Towards the end, Guevara's partner Tay Conti argued with Page and was blindsided by Paige VanZant. Guevara was distracted and this allowed Sky to hit the TKO on him to win the match. Post-match, VanZant signed her AEW contract on Conti's prone body. The following week on Dynamite, Sky made his first successful title defense, when he defeated Wardlow.

Championships and accomplishments
All Elite Wrestling
 AEW TNT Championship (2 times) – Scorpio Sky
 Pro Wrestling Illustrated
 Ranked Page as No. 123 of the top 500 singles wrestlers in the PWI 500 in 2021

References

All Elite Wrestling teams and stables